List of Lilium species.

The genus Lilium is within the tribe Lilieae of the subfamily Lilioideae, in the family Liliaceae of the order Liliales.

List
Species of Lilium currently accepted, with approximate native ranges, include:

References

External links

Lilium